Progress M-21M, identified by NASA as Progress 53P, is a Progress spacecraft used by Roskosmos to resupply the International Space Station (ISS) during 2013. Progress M-21M was built by RKK Energia.

Launch
The spacecraft was launched on time at 20:53:06 UTC on 25 November 2013 from the Baikonur Cosmodrome in Kazakhstan.

Docking
The Kurs-NA docking system was tested by Progress M-21M during a fly-by of the ISS on 28 November 2013. Progress M-21M later docked with the ISS on 29 November 2013 at 22:30:20 UTC.

Cargo
Progress M-21M delivers goods to the ISS, as fuel components, water, service equipment, equipment for scientific experiments, containers with food, and parcels for the crew. The total mass of all delivered goods is 2398 pounds.

Orbit change
On 13 March 2014, Progress M-21M was used to raise the orbit of the ISS by "two kilometers" after an engine burn of "almost ten minutes".

Kurs-NA docking system re-test
Due to problems with the Kurs-NA docking system during the last test in November 2013, another test with the system was successfully done during a two-day free flying period in April 2014. Progress M-21M undocked from the Zvezda module at 08:58 UTC on 23 April 2014 and was guided back to the same docking port two days later, docking at 12:13 UTC on 25 April 2014.

Undocking and reentry
Progress M-21M undocked from the ISS on 9 June 2014 at 13:29 UTC and was deorbited the same day at 17:23 UTC.

References

Progress (spacecraft) missions
Spacecraft launched in 2013
Spacecraft which reentered in 2014
2013 in Russia
Spacecraft launched by Soyuz-U rockets
Supply vehicles for the International Space Station